Marzia Stano known by the stage name of UNA, is an Italian singer.

Career
She founded in 1999, together with Gianni Masci, Valentino Caporizzi and Antonello Chindemi, the band Jolaurlo.

In 2009 she began working with pianist Lucio Morelli (Gazzè Paola) on his first solo album with musicians and friends including Angela Baraldi, Gianluca Bartolo (Devil's Pan), Gianni Masci (Jolaurlo), Giacomo Fiorenza (I dogs, Colapesce) and Andrea Mancin (Giardini di Miro). In October 2012 she flew to the United States to join Negrita, Subsonica, Mannarino, Mama Marjas and other artists at the Festival HIT WEEK.

Her first album, No One hundred thousand was released in May 2013 for MArteLabel. She then performed on a European mini-tour of Paris, Brussels and Berline. (dall'UNconventionAl Tour) with the support of Puglia Sounds Records.

In August, she took part in Budapest's 2013 Sziget Festival.

In early October she released her second single "Here and Now".

On December 6 she was one of the headliners at Medimex 2013 and on the 7th she performed in Rome as a finalist of the Prize "Fabrizio de André", receiving the AFI Award 2013 – Best Project Discografico.

In January 2014 she started another tour. In April she joined Dellera (Afterhours) in a mini-tour. She performed with Gianni Masci (guitars) and Luke "Spring" Jura (drums and percussion) . In May  she performed in Taranto and at Rome Folk Fest. She released an album in September.

On June 10 she released "#Scopamici", the first single from the new album on Fanpage.it, which received 60000 views in one month. On September 6 she released "Mario love you" on MTV in the New Generation. "As in heaven, so on earth" was released on September 23 in MArteLabel digital stores and on the 30th in record stores.

She backed the release with a European mini-tour in Berlin, Brussels, Luxembourg and Paris. In April she released the video of the single "Under the sky Ilva", a song chosen to open the May Day concert in Taranto.

In 2015 she undertook a tour of major national and international stages, including the Sziget Festival in Budapest and Rome Folk Fest.

References

External links
 

Year of birth missing (living people)
Living people
Italian women singers